Lloyd Leonard Ahlquist (born January 18, 1977), better known by his online alias EpicLLOYD, is an American internet personality best known for the YouTube video series Epic Rap Battles of History, along with Peter Shukoff ("Nice Peter"). Ahlquist has performed as an MC, actor, improviser and writer. In addition to the rap battles, Ahlquist, along with Shukoff, appeared in a cameo in The SpongeBob Movie: Sponge Out of Water.

Comedy and theater
Ahlquist was formerly the General Manager and Artistic Director of M.I.'s Westside Comedy Theater. Ahlquist also studied at UMass Amherst and later trained in Chicago (where he met his frequent collaborator Peter Shukoff) at The Second City, Improv Olympic and Annoyance Theatre. Ahlquist was one of the founding members of Mission IMPROVable, and continues to perform with the group weekly in their show "The Grind" while serving on the Board of Directors of M.i. Productions. He founded the comedy troupe after dropping out of the University of Massachusetts with five classmates.

In August 2014, Ahqluist hosted YouTube's first live-streamed improv comedy event, "Off the Top." A trailer for "Epic Studios", a show starring Ahlquist, was released in 2015 and the first episodes were posted to his personal YouTube channel in April 2017.

YouTube

Solo channel
Lloyd runs his own YouTube channel that launched on April 20, 2011. Ahlquist has a staple series on his own channel, titled "Dis Raps For Hire", which features Ahlquist taking a user-submitted comment asking Ahlquist to lyrically "destroy" or insult another person that is bullying or harassing the user. To date, 20 "Dis Raps for Hire" have been produced. Season 2 of "Dis Raps for Hire" started on March 11, 2013.

On July 17, 2012, Lloyd's channel hit 200,000 subscribers. As a "thank you" gesture, he produced a parody of the Cinnamon challenge. In 2016, Lloyd hit 400,000 subscribers. By 2021 he had 495,000 subscribers.

Starting in 2017, EpicLLOYD has also run the series Epic Studios, where he portrays a fictional version of himself as he struggles to keep the Canadian music studio he inherited from his father from being turned into condos.

Epic Rap Battles of History

In 2010, Ahlquist partnered with singer and rapper Peter Shukoff to create Epic Rap Battles of History under Maker Studios sometime after Ahlquist, Shukoff and Zach Sherwin (a guest in the rap battles), were playing Check OneTwo, a freestyle rap improv game where they took suggestions from the audience of famous people to battle rap off the top of their heads. Ahlquist has played several characters in the successful rap battles, and has specialized in playing villains such as Bill O'Reilly and Adolf Hitler. Epic Rap Battles of History received four wins at the 3rd Streamy Awards, with Ahlquist receiving one of the four awards. By October 2014, the rap battles accumulated a total view count of over 1 billion, excluding the hundreds of millions of views earned by the season 1 episodes. As of early 2020, the Epic Rap Battle channel had over 3.4 billion views.

Personal life
Ahlquist grew up in Exeter, New Hampshire and graduated from Exeter High School. He is married to Dr. Josie Ahlquist, a student affairs educator. They live in Los Angeles.

Discography

Albums
Dis Raps for Hire - Season 1 (2013)
Here EP (2016)
Dis Raps for Hire - Season 2 (2018)
A Bad Name for Rappers (2019)

Songs
Dis Raps For Hire - Charles
Dis Raps For Hire - Southwest High School
Dis Raps For Hire - Christian
Dis Raps For Hire - Jennifer
Dis Raps For Hire - Justin
Dis Raps For Hire - James
Dis Raps For Hire - William, Reshad, and Tyrance
Dis Raps For Hire - Daniel
Dis Raps For Hire - Joan
Gift Raps For Hire - Momma Metcalf
Dis Raps For Hire - Glasscock
Dis Raps For Hire - Jason and Ramone
Dis Raps For Hire - Steven, Lucas, Mark, and Nelson
Dis Raps For Hire - EthanAlways
Dis Raps For Hire - Diamond
Dis Raps For Hire - Jerome
Dis Raps For Hire - Katrina & Cheyenne
Dis Raps For Hire - This Guy
Dis Raps for Hire - Cory
Gift Raps for Hire - Brandon
The L-Verse
Coming Up Short
Pawn
Ninja
Mr. Nothing
I Aint Got No Watch (I Aint Got No Bling)
New Things
Holding The Seams Together
Scars
Cheap Beer
Space
Pops Over the Falls
Goodbye

Filmography

Awards and nominations

References

External links

EpicLLOYD
EpicLLOYD
EpicLLOYD
EpicLLOYD
EpicLLOYD
EpicLLOYD
EpicLLOYD
EpicLLOYD
American comedy musicians
Nerdcore artists